Club Dogo was an Italian rap group from Milan (Lombardy) that consists of Guè Pequeno and Jake La Furia, and beatmaker Don Joe.

The group was born in 1999 from the friendship between rappers Gué Pequeno (whose stage name was Lucky Luciano) and Dargen D'Amico. Originally the group name was "Sacre Scuole" and its members were the two aforementioned rappers and Jake La Furia, whose stage name was originally Fame. 
In 2001, after their first and only CD (3 MC's al Cubo), the group was disbanded due to quarrels between Jake and Dargen.

In 2005, Club Dogo formed the crew named Dogo Gang, including other MCs and DJs from Milan that gradually joined the collective.

Club Dogo stopped producing music together in 2014, although none of the three members ever stated the group was officially disbanded.

Discography

Albums
As Sacre Scuole

As Club Dogo

As Dogo Gang

Singles

Other projects
 2005: Don Joe & Grand Agent - Regular (EP)
 2005: Guè Pequeno & Deleterio - Hashishinz Sound Vol. 1 (EP)
 2005: Marracash & Dogo Gang   - Roccia Music Vol. 1 (mixtape)
 2006: DJ Harsh & Guè Pequeno - Fast Life Vol. 1 (mixtape)
 2009: DJ Harsh & Guè Pequeno - Fast Life Vol. 2 (mixtape)
 2012: DJ Harsh & Guè Pequeno - Fast Life Vol. 3 (mixtape)
 2011: Don Joe & Shablo - Thori & Rocce
 2011: Guè Pequeno - Il Ragazzo d'Oro
 2013: Guè Pequeno - Bravo Ragazzo
 2013: Jake La Furia - Musica Commerciale
 2015: Guè Pequeno - Vero
 2016: Jake La Furia - Fuori Da Qui
 2017: Gué Pequeno - Gentleman
 2018: Gué Pequeno - Sinatra
 2019: Gué Pequeno - Gelida Estate (EP)
 2020: Gué Pequeno - Mr. Fini
 2020: with Emis Killa - 17 (Album)
 2021: Gué Pequeno - Fast Life Vol.4
 2022: Gué Pequeno - GVESVS 
 2022: Jake La Furia - Ferro del mestiere

See also
 Italian hip hop

References

External links
 Official Site
  Official Myspace

Italian hip hop groups
Italian rappers
Hip hop groups from Milan
Musical groups from Milan